Scott Kristien Scott-Wilson (born 11 January 1993), known as Scott Wilson, is an English professional footballer who plays as a striker for Bath City.

Career
Wilson started his career in the youth team of his hometown club, Bristol City, but never made a first team appearance. He left Bristol City following two loan spells away from the club.

Wilson joined Macclesfield in 2017 from National League side Eastleigh and signed a one-year deal at the club. On 9 December, he scored a hat-trick against fellow title challengers Wrexham to climb Macclesfield into first position of National League.

On 19 July 2019, he signed for League Two side Oldham Athletic on a free transfer, penning a one-year contract. He featured mainly as a substitute up until January as the Latics struggled towards the bottom end of the table. On 28 February 2020, he signed for National League side Notts County on loan until the end of the 2019–20 season.

On 1 July 2020, Wilson was released by Oldham Athletic.

On 7 July 2020, he signed a short term contract with Notts County so that he could feature in the play-off games following the suspension in the league due to Covid-19. However, he didn't feature in any of the matches as County lost the play-off final to Harrogate Town, and he was subsequently released.

On 23 October 2020, Wilson joined National League side Dagenham & Redbridge on a free transfer.

On 29 January 2022, he joined fellow National League side Aldershot Town on an initial short-term loan.

On 19 July 2022, Wilson signed for National League South side Bath City.

Career statistics

Honours
Macclesfield Town
National League: 2017–18

References

Living people
1993 births
English footballers
Association football forwards
Bristol City F.C. players
Gloucester City A.F.C. players
Cinderford Town A.F.C. players
Yate Town F.C. players
Bath City F.C. players
Paulton Rovers F.C. players
Weston-super-Mare A.F.C. players
Eastleigh F.C. players
Macclesfield Town F.C. players
Oldham Athletic A.F.C. players
Notts County F.C. players
Dagenham & Redbridge F.C. players
Aldershot Town F.C. players
English Football League players
National League (English football) players
Southern Football League players